Traps is an American police drama that aired on CBS from March 31, 1994 to April 27, 1994. The series was created by Stephen J. Cannell and produced by Stephen J. Cannell Productions in association with CBS Entertainment Productions.

Premise
Joe Trapchek was a retired chief of police in Seattle, Washington who came out of retirement to consult on cases. Also seen were Detective Chris Trapchek, Joe's grandson, and Detective Jack Cloud, Chris' partner and the ex-partner of Chris' father who was killed in the line of duty.

Cast
 George C. Scott as Joe Trapcheck
 Dan Cortese as Detective Chris Trapchek
 Bill Nunn as Detective Jack Cloud
 Piper Laurie as Cora Trapchek
 Lindsay Crouse as Laura Parkhurst

Episodes

References

1994 American television series debuts
1994 American television series endings
1990s American drama television series
CBS original programming
Television series by Stephen J. Cannell Productions
Television shows set in Seattle
Television series by CBS Studios